Vimodrone (historically Modrone or  Vico Modrone) is a comune (municipality) in the Metropolitan City of Milan in the Italian region of Lombardy.

Vimodrone borders the following municipalities: Cologno Monzese, Cernusco sul Naviglio, Milan, Pioltello and Segrate.

The area has historical associations with the Visconti di Modrone family.

Twin towns
Vimodrone is twinned with:

  Bella, Italy, since 2012
  Cittanova, Italy, since 2017

References

External links
 Official website

Cities and towns in Lombardy